The Albanian National Olympic Committee (Albanian: Komiteti Olimpik Kombëtar Shqiptar - KOKSH) is a non-profit organisation and the legal authority of Albania's participation in the Olympic Games. As a member of the International Olympic Committee (IOC), it is responsible for the development and management of all olympic related activities in the country.

Members of the committee are 46 sports federations, which elect the Executive Council composed of the president and ten members.

It is based in the country's capital, Tirana.

History 
The National Olympic Committee of Albania (KOKSH) was founded in 1958 and a year later gained recognition by the International Olympic Committee.

From the year of its foundation until 1989 the committee was known by the name "The General Council Committee of Sportspersons of Albania" and included in its core all the sports federations in the country.

With the change of the political system in Albania, in 1990, the committee was restructured as an independent entity, separate from the newly formed Ministry of Culture, Youth and Sports. Four years later, in 1994, by government decrees No.20 and No.401, it was sanctioned as a non-state non-profit organisation whose functions were based on the Olympic Charter.

Executive committee 
The committee of the KOKSH is represented by:
 President: Fidel Ylli
 Vice President: Erlind Pellumbi
 Members: , Luiza Gega, Florend Kalivopulli, Enkelejda Caushi, Labo Capo, Endrit Hoxha, Izmir Smajlaj

Member federations 
The Albanian National Federations are the organizations that coordinate all aspects of their individual sports. They are responsible for training, competition and development of their sports. There are currently 24 Olympic Summer and two Winter Sport Federations and 20 Non-Olympic Sports Federations in Albania.

Olympic Sport federations

Non-Olympic Sport federations

See also 
Albania at the Olympics

References

External links 
 Official website

Albania
Albania at the Olympics
Olympic
1958 establishments in Albania
Sports organizations established in 1958